Anal dysplasia is a pre-cancerous condition which occurs when the lining of the anal canal undergoes abnormal changes. It can be classified as low grade squamous intraepithelial lesions (LSIL) and high-grade squamous intraepithelial lesions (HSIL). 
Most cases are not associated with symptoms, but people may notice lumps in and around the anus.

Causes
Anal dysplasia is most commonly linked to human papillomavirus (HPV), a usually sexually-transmitted infection. HPV is the most common sexually transmitted infection in the United States while genital herpes (HSV) was the most common sexually transmitted infection globally.

Diagnosis

See also
 Human papillomavirus
 Anal cancer

References

Colorectal surgery